Allan van Rankin Galland (born 4 October 1987) is a Mexican former professional footballer who last played as a goalkeeper for Atlante.

Van Rankin played with 3rd division team Tecamachalco, where he was also their captain. He signed with Atlante prior to the Apertura 2008 tournament. Van Rankin is currently playing 4th string goalie behind Antonio Pérez, Moisés Muñoz, and Eder Patiño.

Allan has a twin brother, Elliot, who is a racing driver in the NASCAR Corona Series. He also has another brother, Josecarlos, who plays with CD Guadalajara.

His uncle, Jorge, better known as "El Burro" (The Donkey), is one of the most famous radio and television hosts in Mexico.

External links
 
 

1987 births
Living people
Liga MX players
Liga Premier de México players
Tecamachalco F.C. footballers
Atlante F.C. footballers
Association football goalkeepers
Footballers from Mexico City
Mexican footballers
Twin sportspeople
Mexican twins
Mexican people of Dutch descent